"Downtown Venus" is the first single released from American hip hop-R&B act P.M. Dawn's third studio album, Jesus Wept (1995). The second track on the album, the song was written by the duo's lead vocalist, Prince Be (under his real name, Attrell Cordes) and produced by P.M. Dawn. It is built around a sample of "Hush" by Deep Purple, so writer Joe South was given a writing credit.

Released on August 22, 1995, "Downtown Venus" did not replicate the success of the band's previous singles, peaking at number 48 on the US Billboard Hot 100 and number 58 in the United Kingdom. Because of its guitar-driven rock sound, the song was serviced to alternative radio stations and reached number 39 on the Billboard Modern Rock Tracks chart, marking P.M. Dawn's only appearance on the listing.

Composition
"Downtown Venus" is heavily built on a sample of the 1967 song "Hush", written by Joe South, as covered by English rock band Deep Purple in 1968. Billboard magazine editor Paul Verna has described the track as a rock song with pop and R&B tones. Larry Flick of the same publication compared the song's vocals to those of John Lennon and noted its "psychedelic" guitar chords.

Release and reception
Before the song was sent to contemporary hit radio (CHR), Gee Street Records and Island Records decided to service the track to alternative radio stations first, as they wanted to demonstrate that P.M. Dawn could stray from their established pop sound; this was done during late August and early September, and the song was added to rhythmic contemporary and contemporary hit radio on August 22, 1995. It became P.M. Dawn's only song to appear on the US Billboard Modern Rock Tracks chart, on which it peaked at number 39 in September 1995. Following additions to CHR playlists as well as its physical release, the song reached number 48 on the Billboard Hot 100 and number 21 on the Billboard Mainstream Top 40 in early October. It did not fare well internationally, stalling at number 43 in Canada, number 58 in the United Kingdom, and number 73 in Australia.

Track listings

US 7-inch and cassette single
A. "Downtown Venus" (album version) – 3:40
B. "She Dreams Persistent Maybes" – 3:35

US CD single
 "Downtown Venus" (album version) – 3:40
 "Downtown Venus" (Kiss My Wife Mix) – 5:12
 "She Dreams Persistent Maybes" – 3:35

UK and Australasian CD single
 "Downtown Venus" (original version) – 3:40
 "Downtown Venus" (Kiss My Wife Mix) – 5:12
 "Downtown Venus" (I Wanna Be into You Mix) – 5:07
 "She Dreams Persistent Maybes" – 3:35

Credits and personnel
Credits are taken from the US CD single liner notes.

Studio
 Recorded at Bliss Studios

Personnel
 Prince Be – vocals, writer (as Attrell Cordes)
 Cameron Greider – electric and acoustic guitars, bass guitar
 Michael Fossenkemper – mixing
 Joe South – writer of "Hush" sample
 P.M. Dawn – producer

Charts

References

1995 singles
Island Records singles
Mercury Records singles
P.M. Dawn songs
Songs written by Attrell Cordes
Songs written by Joe South